Broun is a surname. It is the Middle English and Scots spelling of Brown. Notable people with the surname include:

Agnes Broun (1732–1820), mother of Scottish poet Robert Burns
Alex Broun (born 1965), Australian playwright and screenwriter
Dauvit Broun (born 1961), Scottish historian
Elizabeth Broun (born 1946), American museum director
Frank Broun (1876–1930), Australian politician
Heywood Broun (1888–1939), American journalist
Heywood Hale Broun (1918–2001), American journalist, son of Heywood Broun
Hob Broun (1950–1987), American author 
Jeremy Broun, British furniture designer and maker, writer, film maker and musician
John Allan Broun (1817–1879), Scottish scientist who worked on magnetism in India
Maurice Broun (1906–1979), American ornithologist and naturalist
Paul Broun (born 1946)), US Congressman from Georgia
Peter Broun (1797–1846), first Colonial Secretary of Western Australia
Thomas Broun (1838–1919), New Zealand soldier, farmer, teacher and entomologist
William Leroy Broun (1827–1902), President of the Alabama Polytechnic Institute

See also
Broun Baronets, descendants of Sir Patrick Broun, 1st Baronet, of Colstoun (–1688)
Clan Broun, Scottish clan name

References